Loaded TV was a British television channel created as a spin-off from the popular men's magazine Loaded. It was launched on 26 November 2012 and streamed live on the Loaded TV website. The channel had also previously broadcast during the evenings on Controversial TV.

Loaded TV was launched by Paul Baxendale-Walker (also known as Paul Chaplin) who purchased SuperBike and Loaded magazines after Vitality Publishing went into administration in April 2012.

Production
The majority of shows were produced in house at the extensive Loaded TV studios in Hersham, Surrey.

There are however some notable acquisitions on the channel. Marshal's Law, for example, is a comedy produced by Telly Juice.

On 10 December 2012 it was announced that Loaded TV would be partnering with Frank Maloney to show free-to-air boxing on the channel.

Ratings

First week ratings suggested that Loaded TV had viewing figures above those of more established UK satellite names such as Fox News, achieving a weekly reach of 148,000.

References

External links

Television channels in the United Kingdom
Television channels and stations established in 2012